La Tossa is a mountain in Catalonia, Spain. It has an elevation of 887 meters (2,910 ft) above sea level.

References

Mountains of Catalonia